Chicago 90 is a racing video game released by Microïds in 1989. It provides two game modes: one as a gangster, and one as the police, each with opposing goals and different strategies. In the "gangsters mode" you simply have to escape the city while avoiding being trapped by the police. In the "police mode" you can control six police cars (by directly driving any of the six and issuing commands to the other five) in an attempt to prevent the gangster from escaping the city.

Gameplay

See also
 List of Microids games

References

External links
Chicago 90 at Atari Mania
Chicago 90 at Lemon Amiga
Official Microïds website

1989 video games
Amiga games
Amstrad CPC games
Atari ST games
DOS games
Europe-exclusive video games
Microïds games
Racing video games
Video games about police officers
Video games developed in France
Video games set in Chicago